Yerbogachen, sometimes written Erbogachen or Erbogachene, is a rural locality in Irkutsk Oblast, Russia, located on the Nizhnyaya Tunguska River. It is the administrative center of Katangsky District. Population:

History 
Yergobachen was founded in 1786 by Russian fur hunters not far from an Evenk settlement. The name - the original name was Nerbeketschen (Нэрбэкэчэн) - which goes back to the Evenki nerbeke for a "pine -covered hill"

From 1925 the village belonged to the Preobrazhensky Life Guards Regiment based in the 140 km upstream (to the south) village of Preobrazhenka, until it was merged in 1929 in the Kirensky rajon based in Kirensk an der Lena. In December 10, 1930, Jerbogatschon became the administrative seat of the newly formed Evenki national rajon Katanga (Russian Katangski nazionalny (Ewenkijski) rajon, after the name Katanga for the upper reaches of the Stony Tunguska in the western part of the area). During this time, the town's economy expanded to include coal mining and other industries.   

Before 1940 the rajon lost the status of a national rajon and has borne its current name ever since. 

Yerbogachen continued to grow and develop, and it became an important transportation hub in the region.

In the late 20th and early 21st centuries, Yerbogachen has faced a number of challenges, including declining population and economic decline. Despite these challenges, the town remains an important center of industry and transportation in eastern Siberia.

Transportation
Despite its location, the town has good transportation links to the rest of the country. Yerbogachen is connected to the rest of Russia by road and rail.
By road, Yerbogachen is connected to the rest of Irkutsk Oblast and beyond by the M53 federal highway, which runs through the town. The town is also served by local bus routes, which provide transportation to nearby towns and villages.
By rail, Yerbogachen is served by the Trans-Siberian Railway, which runs through the town and connects it to the rest of Russia. The town has a railway station with regular passenger and freight services.
In addition to these forms of transportation, Yerbogachen is also served by a small airport, which offers limited flights to other cities in the region.

Considering its remote location, transportation and accessibility to Yerbogachen are adequate. However, travel times may be extended given the town's distance from major cities.

Climate
Yerbogachen has a subarctic climate (Köppen climate classification Dfc). Precipitation is quite low, but is significantly higher in summer than at other times of the year.

Yerbogachen has a climate comparable to that of the Yakutia. As of 2017, It is probably also one of the only locations outside Yakutia that has a temperature amplitude of 100 °C (180 °F).

References

Rural localities in Irkutsk Oblast
Road-inaccessible communities of Russia